Celypha rurestrana, the hawkweed marble, is a moth of the family Tortricidae. It was described by Philogène Auguste Joseph Duponchel in 1843. It is found in most of Europe, except Ireland, Lithuania, Ukraine and the western part of the Balkan Peninsula. It is also found in Turkey.

The wingspan is 12–17 mm. The forewings are grey, marbled with blackish brown and banded with white. The hindwings are light bronzy grey. Adults are on wing from May to the beginning of August in two generations per year.

The larvae feed on Hieracium umbellatum, Sonchus and Vaccinium species. They feed within the roots of their host plant living within a silken tube or tent. Larvae can be found from April to June. They are pale brown with a dark brown head.

References

 "Celypha rurestrana (Duponchel, 1843)". Insecta.pro.

Moths described in 1843
Olethreutini
Moths of Europe
Moths of Asia